This is a list of medalists who represented Malaysia and her predecessor states at multi-sport and major events of badminton.

Medal leaders

Multi-sport events

Historic

Olympic Games

Commonwealth Games

Regional

Asian Games

Sub-Regional

Southeast Asian Games

Team championships

Thomas & Uber Cup

Sudirman Cup

Asia Team Championships

Asia Mixed Team Championships

Continental championships

World Badminton Championships

Asia Badminton Championships

Major tournaments

Season-ending Championships

All England Open Badminton Championships

Notes

References

Lists of badminton medalists
Badminton in Malaysia